Edward Conor Marshall O'Brien (3 November 1880 – 18 April 1952) was an Irish aristocrat and intellectual. His views were republican and nationalist. He was also owner and captain of one of the first boats to sail under the tri-colour of the Irish Free State. He was the first amateur Irish sailor to sail around the world.

O'Brien was a grandson of the Young Irelander William Smith O'Brien, and learned Irish. He was a ship builder and designer, and his notable boats include the Kelpie (used for gun running in 1914), the Saoirse (in which he circumnavigated the globe) and the Ilen (a Falkland Islands service ship).

Early life
Edward Conor Marshall O'Brien was born in Limerick on 3 November 1880. His grandfather was William O'Brien who was a member of Young Ireland; his grandfather and his aunt Charlotte Grace O'Brien both played roles in social reform. Robert Donough, his uncle, was an architect, and the painter Dermod O'Brien was his brother. O'Brien was educated in England at Winchester College and Oxford, and in Ireland in Trinity College. After his education he came back to Ireland and started practicing as an architect in 1903. According to the 1911 census he lived at 58 Mount Street, south County Dublin.

Architect
O'Brien was credited with two buildings in his lifetime: the Co-operative Hall in Co. Donegal and the People's Hall in Co. Limerick. He was also known as a naval architect, having designed two ships, the Saoirse and the llen. He would later captain both of these ships himself.

Across Three Oceans

O'Brien's boat Saoirse was reputedly the first small boat (42-foot, 13 metres long) to sail around the world since Joshua Slocum completed his voyage in the 'Spray' during 1895 to 1898. a journey that O' Brien documented in his book Across Three Oceans. O’Brien’s voyage began and ended at the Port of Foynes, County Limerick, Ireland, where he lived.

Saoirse, under O'Brien's command and with three crew, was the first yacht to circumnavigate the world by way of the three great capes: Cape Horn, Cape of Good Hope and Cape Leeuwin; and was the first boat flying the Irish tri-colour to enter many of the world's ports and harbours. He ran down his easting in the Roaring Forties and Furious Fifties between the years 1923 to 1925. Up until O'Brien's circumnavigation this route was the preserve of square-rigged grain ships taking part in the grain race from Australia to England via Cape Horn (also known as the clipper route).

Restoration of the Ilen
O'Brien's seagoing experiences were put to use in his design of the Ilen which was built for the Falkland Islands as a service boat. In 1998 the Ilen returned to the site where she was first built, on the river Ilen near Baltimore in south-west Ireland, where she underwent a full restoration and was re-launched in May 2018.  This task provided work-based learning for the students of the Ilen School.

Gun running
O'Brien had some involvement with gun running in 1914 on behalf of the Irish Volunteers, for political reasons (he was a home ruler) and because he had experience in sailing. On 26 July 1914, 900 guns were brought to Howth harbour aboard Erskine Childer's yacht Asgard. As part of the same operation Conor O Brien transported arms on his yacht, Kelpie.  The guns on Kelpie were transhipped to another yacht, Chotah, owned by Sir Thomas Myles, before being landed at Kilcoole in County Wicklow on 1 August 1914. After the gun running incidents, O'Brien served in the Royal Naval Volunteer Reserve.

Mountaineering 
O'Brien was a keen mountaineer as well as a sailor. He was known for climbing in bare feet, He climbed Mount Brandon in south-west Ireland and Mount Snowdon in Wales with George Mallory and Geoffrey Winthrop Young among others. Later, during his circumnavigation 1923-1925 he planned to climb Mount Cook / Aoraki in the Southern Alps in New Zealand's South Island. However because of delays during his circumnavigation he arrived in New Zealand too late.

Publications
O'Brien authored a number of books which document his experiences of sailing, from which he distilled advice for other boat designers, builders and sailors. He also wrote novels on the nautical theme.

Non-fiction
 Across three oceans
 From three yachts - a cruiser's outlook
 The small ocean-going yacht
 Yacht gear and gadgets
 Sea-boats, oars and sails
 The practical man's cruiser
 On going to sea in yachts
 Deep-water Yacht
 Sea-boats, oars and sails
  Voyage and Discovery (1933)

Fiction
 The Castaways
 The Runaways
 Atlantic Adventure
 The Luck of the Golden Salmon
 Two Boys go Sailing

Sources 

Life and ships of Conor O'Brien - documented on the A K Ilen restorer's website.
Conor O'Brien: Life, Works, Criticism, Notes
Foynes Yacht Club - History (paragraph 2 on Conor O'Brien and the Saoirse)

References

Irish sailors
1880 births
1952 deaths